Purity of Essence is the ninth studio album by Australian group Hoodoo Gurus. It was released on 12 March 2010 and peaked at No. 16 on the ARIA Charts.

The album was co-produced by the band with Charles Fisher, who produced two  of the band's previous albums, Mars Needs Guitars! and Blue Cave. The album was mixed by Ed Stasium, who previously worked with the Hoodoo Gurus on the Kinky and Crank.

Background
Hoodoo Gurus were formed in 1981 in Sydney, their eighth studio album, Mach Schau, was released in 2004. They were inducted into the Australian Recording Industry Association (ARIA) Hall of Fame on 18 July 2007. This was followed by a national tour of Australia called 'Clash of the Titans' with The Stems and Radio Birdman. According to Hoodoo Gurus frontman, Dave Faulkner, there were tentative plans to release a new album in 2009, although little material had been written by July 2008.

In March 2009, Hoodoo Gurus signed a new recording contract with Sony Music Australia, the deal includes the band's back catalogue as well as a new album, the band's ninth studio album. The album was originally scheduled for release in September 2009 but they were not happy with the final mix. Hoodoo Gurus then sent their songs off to Durango, Colorado, where Ed Stasium, who worked on the band's previous albums Kinky and Crank, worked with Faulkner. Faulkner flew to the US after Hoodoo Gurus performed in Japan, their first performances there in over 20 years.

In August 2009 it was revealed that guitarist Brad Shepherd had been diagnosed with cancer and was recovering from recent surgery. It was his second cancer diagnosis, having had a melanoma removed five years earlier.

The first single from their new album, "Crackin' Up", was released in December 2009 and received some airplay on Australian radio stations. The album, Purity of Essence, was released on 12 March 2010 in Australia and internationally on 11 May.

A limited edition of the album was also released which included a bonus DVD containing four live tracks, part of the "Max Sessions in the Sand", recorded at the St Kilda Festival on 10 February 2008.

Track listing

Personnel
Credited to:

Hoodoo Gurus members
 Dave Faulkner – lead vocals, guitar
 Rick Grossman – bass
 Mark Kingsmill – drums
 Brad Shepherd – guitar, vocals

Additional musicians
Andy Bickers – saxophone (tracks 4, 10)
Erina Clark – backing vocals (tracks 5, 10)
Ian Cooper – viola (track 8)
Garrett Costigan – pedal steel guitar (tracks 11, 16)
Anthony Kable – trombone (tracks 4, 10)
Adrian Keating  – violin (track 8)
Stewart Kirwan – trumpet (tracks 4, 10)
Sophie Serafino – violin (track 8)
Prinnie Stevens – backing vocals (tracks 5, 10)

Production details
 Engineer – Tim Whitten 
 Engineer assistants – Jason Lea
 Mastering – Greg Calbi at Sterling Sonic, New York
 Mastering (additional) - Don Bartley (track 1) at Benchmark Mastering, Sydney
 Mixers – Ed Stasium at Kozytone Studio, Durango, Colorado
 Producers – Hoodoo Gurus, Charles Fisher
 Artwork - DK Sony
Design and layout – Doug Bartlett
Artists – David Bowers, Nick Morris
 Photography – Tony Mott 
 Recording studio – Electric Avenue Studios, Camperdown, NSW
 Additional recording – The Dream Academy (Newport, Vic), Studios 301 (Alexandria, NSW), The Vault (Balmain, NSW)

Charts

Release history

References

Hoodoo Gurus albums
Sony Music Australia albums
2010 albums